Caucasus hunter-gatherer (CHG), also called Satsurblia Cluster is an anatomically modern human genetic lineage, first identified in a 2015 study, based on the population genetics of several modern Western Eurasian (European, Caucasian and Near Eastern) populations. 

The CHG lineage descended from a population that diverged from a Common Western Eurasian meta-population early; and separated from the "Anatolian Hunter Gatherer" (AHG) lineage later, around 25,000 years ago, during the Last Glacial Maximum. The Caucasus hunter-gatherers managed to survive in isolation through the Last Glacial Maximum as a distinct population. 

At the beginning of the Neolithic, at c. 8000 BCE, they were probably distributed across western Iran and the Caucasus,  and people similar to northern Caucasus and Iranian plateau hunter-gatherers arrived before 6000 BCE in Pakistan and north-west India. Eastern Hunter-Gatherers from the Pontic-Caspian steppes have received admixture from CHGs, leading to the formation of Western Steppe Herders (WSHs). WSHs formed the Yamnaya culture and expanded massively throughout Europe during the Late Neolithic and Early Bronze Age.

Origins

Jones et al. (2015) analyzed genomes from males from western Georgia, in the Caucasus, from the Late Upper Palaeolithic (13,300 years old) and the Mesolithic (9,700 years old). These two males carried Y-DNA haplogroup: J* and J2a, later refined to J1-FT34521, and J2-Y12379*, and mitochondrial haplogroups of K3 and H13c, respectively. Their genomes showed that a continued mixture of the Caucasians with Middle Eastern populations took place up to 25,000 years ago, when the coldest period in the last Ice Age started.

CHG ancestry was also found in an Upper Palaeolithic specimen from Satsurblia cave (dated ca. 11000 BC), and in a Mesolithic one from Kotias Klde cave, in western Georgia (dated ca. 7700 BC). The Satsurblia individual is closest to modern populations from the South Caucasus.

Fu et al. (2016), comparing CHG to the 13,700 year-old Bichon man genome (found in Switzerland) detected a split between CHG and "Western European Hunter-Gatherer" (WHG) lineages, about 45,000 years ago, the presumed time of the original peopling of Europe. CHG separated from the "Anatolian Hunter Gatherer" (AHG) lineage later, at 25,000 years ago, during the Last Glacial Maximum.

Margaryan et al. (2017) analysing South Caucasian ancient mitochondrial DNA found a rapid increase of the population at the end of the Last Glacial Maximum, about 18,000 years ago. The same study also found continuity in descent in the maternal line for 8,000 years. 

According to Narasimhan et al. (2019) Iranian farmer related people arrived before 6000 BCE in Pakistan and north-west India, before the advent of farming in northern India. They suggest the possibility that this "Iranian farmer–related ancestry [...] was [also] characteristic of northern Caucasus and Iranian plateau hunter-gatherers."

Proto-Indo Europeans

The Proto-Indo-Europeans, i.e. the Yamnaya people and related cultures, seem to have been a mix from Eastern European Hunter-Gatherers (EHGs); and people related to the near east, either Caucasus hunter-gatherers or Iran Chalcolithic people, with a Caucasian hunter-gatherer component. Each of those two populations contributed about half the Yamnaya DNA. According to co-author Andrea Manica of the University of Cambridge:

According to Jones et al. (2015), Caucasus hunter-gatherers (CHG) "genomes significantly contributed to the Yamnaya steppe herders who migrated into Europe ~3,000 BCE, supporting a formative Caucasus influence on this important Early Bronze Age culture. CHG left their imprint on modern populations from the Caucasus and also central and south Asia possibly marking the arrival of Indo-Aryan languages."

Lazaridis et al. (2016) proposes a different people, likely from Iran, as the source for the Middle Eastern ancestry of the Yamnaya people, finding that "a population related to the people of the Iran Chalcolithic contributed ~43% of the ancestry of early Bronze Age populations of the steppe". That study asserts that these Iranian Chalcolithic people were a mixture of "the Neolithic people of western Iran, the Levant, and Caucasus Hunter Gatherers". 

Gallego-Llorente et al. (2016) conclude that Iranian populations are not a likelier source of the 'southern' component in the Yamnaya than Caucasus hunter-gatherers. 

Wang et al. (2018) analysed genetic data of the North Caucasus of fossils dated between the 4th and 1st millennia BC and found correlation with modern groups of the South Caucasus, concluding that "unlike today – the Caucasus acted as a bridge rather than an insurmountable barrier to human movement".

CHG admixture was also found in South Asia, in a possible marker of the Indo-Aryan migration there.

Ancient Greece and Aegean  
Beyond contributing to the population of mainland Europe through Bronze Age pastoralists of the Yamnaya, CHG also appears to have arrived on its own in the Aegean without eastern European hunter–gatherer ancestry and provided approximately 9–32% of ancestry to the Minoans. The origin of this CHG component might have been Central Anatolia.

See also
Prehistoric Caucasus

Notes

References

Sources

Further reading

External links
Caucasus Hunter-Gatherer ancestry and Indo-Hittite 

Peopling of Europe
Last Glacial Maximum
Mesolithic Europe
Mesolithic Asia
Upper Paleolithic Europe
Upper Paleolithic Asia
Prehistoric Caucasus
CHG
Indo-European genetics
Hunter-gatherers of Asia
Hunter-gatherers of Europe